Downer may refer to:

 Downer (surname), various persons of that name
 Downer, Australian Capital Territory, a suburb of Canberra, Australia
 Downer Glacier, Alaska
 Downer, Minnesota, an unincorporated community
 Downer (soil), the New Jersey state soil
 Downer (animal), a livestock animal that is to be killed because it cannot stand
 "Downer" (song), on the grunge band Nirvana's debut album Bleach
 Downer, a hard rock band that released an album on Roadrunner Records in 2001.
 Downers, slang for depressant drugs
 Downer Group, an Australian company
 Downer Rail, an Australian railroad company
 Downer College, a former women's college in Fox Lake, Wisconsin
 Downer Methodist Episcopal Church, in Monroe Township, New Jersey, on the National Register of Historic Places
 Downer Rowhouses, two sets of row houses in Somerville, Massachusetts, both on the National Register of Historic Places